Dikoleps rolani is a minute species of sea snail, a marine gastropod mollusk in the family Skeneidae.

Description
The height of the shell attains 1 mm.

Distribution
This species occurs in the Mediterranean Sea off Spain; in the Atlantic Ocean off the Canary Islands.

References

 Rubio F., Dantart L. & Luque A.A. (1998). Two new species of Dikoleps (Gastropoda, Skeneidae) from the Mediterranean coast of Spain. Iberus 16(1): 81–93

External links
 

rolani
Gastropods described in 1998